Haris Hajradinović (born 18 February 1994) is a Bosnian professional footballer who plays as an attacking midfielder for Süper Lig club Kasımpaşa and the Bosnia and Herzegovina national team.

Hajradinović started his professional career at Željezničar, before joining Olimpic in 2012. A year later, he moved to Inter Zaprešić. Later that year, he switched to Trenčín. The following year, he was transferred to Gent. In 2016, Hajradinović was loaned to Haugesund, with whom he signed permanently a year after. He went to Osijek in 2017. Two years later, he joined Kasımpaşa.

A former youth international for Bosnia and Herzegovina, Hajradinović made his senior international debut in 2019.

Club career

Early career
Hajradinović came through Željezničar's youth academy. He made his professional debut against Kozara Gradiška on 20 May 2012 at the age of 18.

In June 2012, he switched to Olimpic.

In January 2013, he joined Croatian club Inter Zaprešić.

In the summer, Hajradinović signed with Slovak side Trenčín. On 14 September, he scored his first professional goal in a triumph over Žilina.

In December 2014, he was transferred to Belgian team Gent.

In January 2016, he was sent on a season-long loan to Norwegian outfit Haugesund, with an option to make the transfer permanent, which was activated the following year.

In August 2017, he moved to Osijek.

Kasımpaşa
In January 2019, Hajradinović joined Turkish side Kasımpaşa on a deal until June 2022. He made his official debut for the club on 21 January against Rizespor. On 7 February, he scored his first goal for Kasımpaşa in Turkish Cup game against Akhisarspor. Three months later, he scored his first league goal in a loss to Beşiktaş.

Hajradinović played his 100th game for the team on 23 October 2021.

In June 2022, he extended his contract until June 2026.

International career
Hajradinović represented Bosnia and Herzegovina at various youth levels.

In October 2019, he received his first senior call-up, for UEFA Euro 2020 qualifiers against Italy and Liechtenstein. He debuted against the latter on 18 November.

On 7 September 2020, in a 2020–21 UEFA Nations League game against Poland, Hajradinović scored his first senior international goal.

Personal life
Hajradinović married his long-time girlfriend Belma in October 2021.

Career statistics

Club

International

Scores and results list Bosnia and Herzegovina's goal tally first, score column indicates score after each Hajradinović goal.

Honours
Željezničar
Bosnian Premier League: 2011–12
Bosnian Cup: 2011–12

Gent
Belgian First Division A: 2014–15
Belgian Super Cup: 2015

References

External links

1994 births
Living people
Sportspeople from Prilep
Macedonian people of Bosnia and Herzegovina descent
Citizens of Bosnia and Herzegovina through descent
Bosnia and Herzegovina footballers
Bosnia and Herzegovina youth international footballers
Bosnia and Herzegovina under-21 international footballers
Bosnia and Herzegovina international footballers
Bosnia and Herzegovina expatriate footballers
Association football midfielders
FK Željezničar Sarajevo players
FK Olimpik players
NK Inter Zaprešić players
AS Trenčín players
K.A.A. Gent players
FK Haugesund players
NK Osijek players
Kasımpaşa S.K. footballers
Premier League of Bosnia and Herzegovina players
Croatian Football League players
Slovak Super Liga players
Belgian Pro League players
Eliteserien players
Süper Lig players
Expatriate footballers in Croatia
Expatriate footballers in Slovakia
Expatriate footballers in Belgium
Expatriate footballers in Norway
Expatriate footballers in Turkey
Bosnia and Herzegovina expatriate sportspeople in Croatia
Bosnia and Herzegovina expatriate sportspeople in Slovakia
Bosnia and Herzegovina expatriate sportspeople in Belgium
Bosnia and Herzegovina expatriate sportspeople in Norway
Bosnia and Herzegovina expatriate sportspeople in Turkey